Reg Luckhurst (born 11 November 1935) is a former international speedway rider from England.

Speedway career 
Luckhurst reached the final of the Speedway World Championship in the 1965 Individual Speedway World Championship.

He rode in the top tier of British Speedway from 1959 to 1976, riding for various clubs. He was capped by England four times and Great Britain seven times.

World final appearances

Individual World Championship
 1965 –  London, Wembley Stadium – 12th – 4pts

References 

1935 births
British speedway riders
Canterbury Crusaders riders
Edinburgh Monarchs riders
New Cross Rangers riders
Southampton Saints riders
West Ham Hammers riders
Wimbledon Dons riders
Living people